Ivano Bucci (born 1 December 1986) is a Sammarinese sprinter, who specialized in the 400 metres. Bucci qualified for the 2008 Summer Olympics in Beijing, by shattering both his personal best and a national record of 48.07 seconds at the 2007 IAAF World Championships in Osaka, Japan.

At the 2008 Summer Olympics, Bucci ran in the second heat of the men's 400 metres, against seven other athletes, including top favorite Chris Brown of the Bahamas, and Sweden's Johan Wissman. He finished the race in seventh place by two seconds behind Dominican Republic's Arismendy Peguero, with a seasonal best of 48.57 seconds. Bucci, however, failed to advance into the semi-finals, as he placed fifty-third overall, and was ranked farther below three mandatory slots for the next round.

Bucci is a graduate of electrical engineering at the University of Modena, and also, a full-time member of La Fratellanza 1874 Track Club in his current residence Modena, Italy.

References

External links

NBC 2008 Olympics profile

1986 births
Living people
Sportspeople from Modena
Sammarinese male sprinters
Italian male sprinters
Italian people of Sammarinese descent
Olympic athletes of San Marino
Athletes (track and field) at the 2008 Summer Olympics
Athletes (track and field) at the 2009 Mediterranean Games
World Athletics Championships athletes for San Marino
Mediterranean Games competitors for San Marino